Milesia bequaerti  is a species of hoverfly in the family Syrphidae.

Distribution
Congo.

References

Insects described in 1955
Eristalinae
Diptera of Africa